Seabrook is a station on the Northeast Corridor located in the unincorporated community of Seabrook, Maryland, United States. It is served by almost all weekday MARC Penn Line trains; all Amtrak and weekend MARC Penn Line trains pass through without stopping. It is located at 6221 Seabrook Road south of Lanham Severn Road (Maryland Route 564) in Seabrook, although MARC gives the location as being in Lanham, Maryland. The station is unstaffed and is located at the end of a dead-end street. Parking is available on the southeast corner of the official address, and also on the opposite side of the tracks on the northeast corner of Seabrook Road and Smith Avenue.

Station layout
The present high-level platforms were built in the late 1980s, replacing bare asphalt platforms near the now-closed Seabrook Road level crossing. Prior to the mid-1980s two grade crossings were located just northeast of the station near Glenn Dale, Maryland. They were both closed as part of the Northeast Corridor Improvement Plan and replaced with an underpass.

References

External links

Station from Google Maps Street View

MARC Train stations
Penn Line
Stations on the Northeast Corridor
Railway stations in Prince George's County, Maryland
Seabrook, Maryland
Former Pennsylvania Railroad stations